Saint Quentin (died  287 AD) also known as Quentin of Amiens, was an early Christian saint.

Hagiography

Martyrdom
The legend of his life has him as a Roman citizen who was martyred in Gaul.  He is said to have been the son of a man named Zeno, who had senatorial rank.  Filled with apostolic zeal, Quentin traveled to Gaul as a missionary with Saint Lucian, who was later martyred at Beauvais, and others (the martyrs Victoricus and Fuscian are said to have been Quentin's followers). Quentin settled at Amiens and performed many miracles there.

Because of his preaching, he was imprisoned by the prefect Rictiovarus, who had traveled to Amiens from Trier. Quentin was manacled, tortured repeatedly, but refused to abjure his faith. The prefect left Amiens to go to Reims, the capital of Gallia Belgica, where he wanted Quentin judged. But, on the way, in a town named Augusta Veromanduorum (now Saint-Quentin, Aisne), Rictiovarus decided to interrupt his journey and pass sentence: Quentin was tortured again, then beheaded and thrown by the soldiers into the marshes around the Somme.

First inventio
Five years later, a blind woman named Eusebia, born of a senatorial family, came from Rome (following a divine order) and miraculously discovered the body, and a certain blind woman recovered her sight by the sacred relics. A small chapel was built nearby.

Second inventio
The life of bishop Saint Eligius (mainly written in the seventh century), says that the exact place of the tomb was forgotten and that in 641, the bishop, after several days of searching miraculously found it. When the relics were discovered, together with the great nails with which the body had been pierced, Eligius distributed these nails, the teeth, and hair in other places, and enclosed the rest of the sacred treasure in a rich shrine of his own work, which he placed behind the high altar.

Eligius distributed the nails with which Quentin's body had been pierced, as well as some saint's teeth and hair. As he was a skillful goldsmith, he placed the relics in a shrine he had fashioned himself. He also rebuilt the church (now the Saint-Quentin basilica).

Devotion
The devotion of Saint Quentin was important during the Middle Ages, especially in Northern France—as evidenced by the considerable number of place names derived from the saint's (see Saint-Quentin (disambiguation)). The tomb was an important place of pilgrimage, highly favoured by Carolingians (the church was one of the richest in Picardy).

References

External links

Saint Quentin at Saints.SQPN.com
Catholic Online: Saint Quentin
Saint of the Day, October 31: Quentin of Amiens at SaintPatrickDC.org

287 deaths
3rd-century Christian martyrs
3rd-century Gallo-Roman people
Gallo-Roman saints
Year of birth unknown
Legendary Romans